The Phaeotrichaceae are a family of fungi previously considered to be in the order Pleosporales, but now excluded. Taxa have a widespread distribution and are saprobic, on herbivore dung.

References

Dothideomycetes families
Dothideomycetes
Taxa described in 1956